At the 1932 Winter Olympics one individual Nordic combined event was contested. It was held on Wednesday, February 10, 1932 (cross-country skiing) and on Thursday, February 11, 1932 (ski jumping). Unlike today the ski jump was the last event held. Both events were also individual medal events.

Medalists

Results

Final standings

Participating nations
A total of 33 Nordic combined skiers from ten nations competed at the Lake Placid Games:

References

External links
International Olympic Committee results database
Official Official Olympic Report
sports-reference
 

 
1932 Winter Olympics events
1932
1932 in Nordic combined
Nordic combined competitions in the United States
Men's events at the 1932 Winter Olympics